St John the Baptist is a church in the Frenchay area of Bristol, England.

History

The foundations of the church were completed in 1834 by Henry Rumley. The work on the vestry started in 1887 and was completed by the local architect William Larkins Bernard.

It has been designated by English Heritage as a grade II listed building.

The large church has a low battlemented tower with a slender spire which overlooks the common.

The churchyard contains the war graves of six service personnel of World War I and three of World War II.

See also

 Churches in Bristol
 Grade II listed buildings in Bristol

References

Churches completed in 1834
19th-century Church of England church buildings
Grade II listed churches in Bristol
Churches in South Gloucestershire District